Magne Børset (born 1958) is a Norwegian physician, Professor and Head of Department of Cancer Research and Molecular Medicine at Norwegian University of Science and Technology (NTNU) in Trondheim, Norway. Børset is a senior consultant in clinical immunology and transfusion medicine. He is doing research on molecular oncology, immunology, and cancer cells from patients with multiple myeloma – a type of cancer which is localized to the bone marrow.

Honors
 1997: Dr Alexander Malthes award for internal medicine

Publications
Articles

References

1958 births
Living people
Academic staff of the Norwegian University of Science and Technology